Martin Keith Clary (born April 3, 1962) is a former right-handed pitcher in Major League Baseball who played from 1987 to 1990 for the Atlanta Braves.

External links
, or Retrosheet
Pelota Binaria (Venezuelan Winter League)

1962 births
Living people
American expatriate baseball players in Mexico
Atlanta Braves players
Baseball players from Detroit
Buffalo Bisons (minor league) players
Cardenales de Lara players
American expatriate baseball players in Venezuela
Charlotte Knights players
Durham Bulls players
Greenville Braves players
Louisville Redbirds players
Major League Baseball pitchers
Mexican League baseball pitchers
Northwestern Wildcats baseball players
Northwestern Wildcats men's basketball players
Orlando Cubs players
Pericos de Puebla players
Richmond Braves players